The 2019–20 season is CSKA Sofia's 71st season in the First League and their fourth consecutive participation after their administrative relegation in the third division due to mounting financial troubles. This article shows player statistics and all matches (official and friendly) that the club will play during the 2019–20 season.

Players

Current squad

Transfers

In

Out

Pre-season and friendlies

Competitions

Parva Liga

Regular Stage

League table

Results summary

Results by round

Results

Championship round

League table

Results summary

Results by round

Results

Bulgarian Cup

UEFA Europa League

First qualifying round

Second qualifying round

Third qualifying round

Statistics

Appearances and goals

|-
|colspan="14"|Players away from the club on loan:
|-

|-
|colspan="14"|Players who appeared for CSKA Sofia that left during the season:
|-

|}

Goalscorers

Disciplinary Record
Includes all competitive matches. Players listed below made at least one appearance for CSKA first squad during the season.

See also 
PFC CSKA Sofia

References

External links 
CSKA Official Site

PFC CSKA Sofia seasons
CSKA Sofia
CSKA Sofia